Sri Ahobila Mutt (also called Sri Ahobila Matam) is a Vadakalai Sri Vaishnava monastery established around 1400 CE at Ahobilam in Andhra Pradesh, India following the Vadakalai tradition of Vedanta Desika. It is attributed to Sri Adivan Satakopa Swami (originally known as Srinivasacharya).

Sri Adhivan Satakopa, a Vadakalai saint, who was a great grand disciple of Vedanta Desika and a sishya of Ghatikasatham Ammal, the scholarly successor of the celebrated Sri Vaishnava stalwart Nadadoor Ammal, founded and established the Matha, based on the Pancharatra tradition.

The Matha
As per legend, one of the nine Narasimhas of Ahobilam called Lord Malolan jumped into the hands of Srinivasacharya and ordered him to travel the length and breadth of the country.

Current Acharya

The current Acharya is the 46th Jeeyar Srivan Satakopa Sri Ranganatha Yateendra Mahadesikan. He succeeded the previous pontiff 45th Jeeyar Sri Lakshmi Nrsimha Divya Paduka Sevaka Srivan Satakopa Sri Narayana Yateendra Mahadesikan who attained Acharyan Thiruvadi on 19 May 2013 following a prolonged illness.

Temples under purview 
Several temples such as the Nine (Nava) Narasimha temples of Ahobilam, Veeraraghava temple in Tiruvallur and Valvil Rama temple, Aandalakkum ayyan temple in the outskirts of Kumbakonam (Pullaboothankudi), are administered by Ahobila Matha. 

The Matha also has several branches across India.

Sri Ahobila Matha Lakshmi Narasimha Lakshmi Narayana Temple, Ahobila Matha Marg, Chembur in Mumbai. The Ahobila Matha temple in Chembur, Established in 1968, is a preeminent religious center in this northern suburb of Mumbai.

Institutions administered 

The Ahobila Matha has several religious and educational institutions in India which are:

 Sri Ahobila Matha Sanskrit College (Est. 1942)
 Sri Ahobila Matha Veda Patashala (Est. 1942)
 Sri Ahobila Matha Oriental High School (Est. 1952)
 Sri Ahobila Matha Center for Human Resource Development (Est. 2002)
 Sri Malolan College of Arts and Science, Madurantakam, (Est. 2009)

See also 
 Sri Vaishnavism
 Ramanuja
 Ahobilam

References

External links 
 Official site of Sri Ahobila Matha
 Ahobila Mutt Mysore (website)
 Ahobila Mutt Chembur, Mumbai (website)
 

Sri Vaishnavism
Hindu monasteries in India